Marko Snoj (born 19 April 1959) is an Indo-Europeanist, Slavist, Albanologist, lexicographer, and etymologist employed at the Fran Ramovš Institute for Slovene Language of the Scientific Research Center of the Slovenian Academy of Sciences and Arts in Ljubljana, Slovenia. He served as director of the institute from 2008 to 2018. He has made numerous scholarly contributions to Indo-European linguistics, particularly in the realms of Slovene and Albanian, and is noted for his work in advancing Slavic etymology in both scholarly and popular domains. He is a full fellow of the Slovenian Academy of Sciences and Arts.

Career
Marko Snoj was born in Ljubljana. He attended Šentvid High School and studied comparative linguistics at the Department of Comparative Linguistics and Oriental Studies at the Faculty of Arts of the University of Ljubljana, completing his bachelor's degree in 1982 with a specialization in comparative linguistics and Hittitology. His 1984 master's thesis treated the problem of i- and u-coloration in the reflexes of Indo-European syllabic sonorants in Balto-Slavic.  

Following his military service in 1985–86 (which he used for learning Albanian from his fellow conscripts) he worked on his doctoral dissertation on Proto-Slavic z from Indo-European s in Light of the Most Recent Accentological Discoveries, which he defended in 1989. His advisor was the Indo-Europeanist and academy member Bojan Čop; his doctoral committee also included the etymologist and academy member France Bezlaj and Indo-Iranian specialist Varja Cvetko Orešnik.

Work on Slovene etymology
In 1981, he was invited by France Bezlaj to work on the project Etimološki slovar slovenskega jezika (Slovenian Etymological Dictionary). He contributed a considerable number of the entries, especially in the third (1995) and fourth volumes (2005), as well as most of the work for the final, fifth volume Kazala (Indices) (2007). 

His work for the third volume was awarded the Gold Medal of the Scientific Research Institute of the Academy of Sciences.

In 1997 he published a popular etymological desk reference of Slovene, Slovenski etimološki slovar, which was later revised and expanded in 2003. An on-line version of the Slovene Etymological Dictionary is in the Fran Slovene lexicographic portal of the Institute for Slovene Language. 

In appearances on radio and television he has popularized etymology in Slovene. Especially noteworthy is his series of twenty-two one-hour programs on the national television station, TV Slovenija, Besede (Words), which has been rebroadcast several times since its first showing during the February–June 1998 season.

Albanian studies
In the late 1980s he continued his training in Albanian by attending summer courses at the University of Pristina. Later he published Kratka albanska slovnica (A Short Grammar of Albanian) (Ljubljana 1991), Rückläufiges Wörterbuch der albanischen Sprache (Reverse Dictionary of Albanian) (Hamburg 1994), and an article on the history of Albanian studies research in Slovenia in the volume Studime II (Prishtina 1996).

Together with academy member Rexhep Ismajli he prepared an annotated translation into Albanian of studies on Albanian by the renowned Slovene Slavic specialist Franz Miklosich entitled Gjurmime shqiptare/Albanische Forschungen (Albanian Studies; Prishtina 2007).

Contributions to Slavic accentology
During the years 1991–92 under the auspices of a Humboldt Fellowship Snoj studied with the Indo-Europeanist Gert Klingenschmitt at the University of Regensburg, Germany, where he concentrated on problems of Balto-Slavic accentology. His articles on Slavic accentology take into account contemporary work on Indo-European laryngeal theory and the nature of Indo-European paradigms with regard to ablaut and the morphological distribution of word-level prosodic features.

International activity

Snoj has lectured and participated in conferences abroad, including Austria, Belarus, Canada, Croatia, Kosovo, Montenegro, Serbia, and the United States.

In 1994, he established the journal Slovenski jezik / Slovene Linguistic Studies with the American Slavic specialist :sl:Marc L. Greenberg.

Selected bibliography
 1976–2007. Bezlaj, France; Snoj, Marko; Furlan, Metka; Klemenčič, Simona. Etimološki slovar slovenskega jezika. Ljubljana: Mladinska knjiga. 5 vols. . . . 
 1991. Kratka albanska slovnica. Ljubljana: Filozofska fakulteta. 128 pp. 
 1994. Rückläufiges Wörterbuch der albanischen Sprache (Lexicographia Orientalis, Bd. 3). Hamburg: Buske. XI, 482 pp. . 
 2002a. “Etimologija imen”, in Słowiańska onomastika, Encyklopedia, vol. 1. Edited by Ewa Rzetelska-Feleszko & Aleksandra Cieślikowa. Warsaw–Krakow: Towarzystwo Naukowe Warszawskie, pp. 152–4. 
 2002b. “Tuji vplivi: substrati, adstrati, superstrati”, in Słowiańska onomastika, Encyklopedia, vol. 1. Edited by Ewa Rzetelska-Feleszko & Aleksandra Cieślikowa. Warsaw–Krakow: Towarzystwo Naukowe Warszawskie, pp. 210–3. 
 2003. Slovenski etimološki slovar. 2., pregledana in dopolnjena izd. Ljubljana: Modrijan. XXVII, 1022 pp. . 
 2004. “Zur Akzentuierung der urslawischen ter-Stämme”, in Per aspera ad asteriscos: studia indogermanica in honorem Jens Elmegård Rasmussen sexagenarii idibus Martiis anno MMIV. Edited by Adam Hyllested. (Innsbrucker Beiträge zur Sprachwissenschaft, vol. 112). Innsbruck: Institut für Sprachen und Literaturen der Universität, pp. 537–43. 
 2005a. “Etymology”, in Encyclopedia of Linguistics, vol. 1: A–L. Edited by Philipp Strazny. New York: Fitzroy Dearborn, pp. 304–6. 
 2005b. “Zur Bewahrung und weiteren Entwicklung einiger Fälle der urindogermanischen Akzentmobilität im Urslawischen”, in Indogermanica: Festschrift Gert Klingenschmitt: indische, iranische und indogermanische Studien dem verehrten Jubilar dargebracht zu seinem fünfundsechzigsten Geburtstag. Edited by Günter Schweiger. (Studien zur Iranistik und Indogermanistik, vol. 3). Taimering: Schweiger VWT, pp. 605–9. 
 2006. Slovar jezika Janeza Svetokriškega (Dela, 49/7; 49/8). Ljubljana: Založba ZRC. 2 vols., XVIII + 711; 710 pp. . 
 2009. Etimološki slovar slovenskih zemljepisnih imen. Ljubljana : Modrijan : Založba ZRC. 603 pp. 
 2020. Slovar Pohlinovega jezika : na osnovi njegovih jezikoslovnih del. Ljubljana : Založba ZRC. 986 pp.

See also 
 Pristina

References

External links 

 Web page of the Fran Ramovš Institute of the Slovene Language
 Web page of the journal Slovenski jezik / Slovene Linguistic Studies

1959 births
Living people
University of Ljubljana alumni
University of Pristina alumni
Academic staff of the University of Ljubljana
Linguists from Slovenia
Hittitologists
Indo-Europeanists
Etymologists
Slavists
Albanologists
Members of the Slovenian Academy of Sciences and Arts